Slaterobius is a genus of dirt-colored seed bugs in the family Rhyparochromidae. There are at least four described species in Slaterobius.

Species
These four species belong to the genus Slaterobius:
 Slaterobius chisos Slater, Sweet & Brailovsky, 1993
 Slaterobius insignis (Uhler, 1872)
 Slaterobius nigritus Slater, Sweet & Brailovsky, 1993
 Slaterobius quadristriatus (Barber, 1911)

References

Rhyparochromidae
Articles created by Qbugbot